Dancing is a compilation album by Italian singer Elisa, released on 15 July 2008 in CD format in the United States and Canada. A digital version on iTunes was released on 17 June 2008 in the United States and on 25 August 2008 in Canada.

The album, released as part of an effort to introduce Elisa to North American audiences, is a compilation of recordings (some remixed) from previously released albums dating back to 2000.

Released of the full album was preceded by the released of an EP featuring the song "Dancing" which was released in December 2007. Beside the title track, the EP includes "Rock Your Soul" (also included on the Dancing album), along with a live version of '"Dancing'" recorded at the iTunes Festival in London.

The first single from the album is Rainbow in a new remix edition by Glen Ballard.

Track origins
The songs on the album were chosen by Elisa and are culled from most of her albums, with the exception of her first, Pipes & Flowers.

There is only one song from her second album Asile's World (2000): "A Little Over Zero." However this is a remixed version of the original.

From the album Then Comes the Sun (2001) comes "Dancing", "Stranger", "Rainbow" and "Rock Your Soul".

The songs from Lotus (2003) are: "Broken", "Electricity"; "Yashal" and the much-covered Leonard Cohen song, "Hallelujah".

The songs from Pearl Days (2004) are: "The Waves", "City Lights" and "Life Goes On".

Three additional tracks (sources unknown) are included as bonus tracks on the Canadian CD issue: "Stay", "Una Poesia Anche Per Te" (Italian version of "Life Goes On") and "Qualcosa che non c'è". Another track, "Wild Horses", was available only in the US through iTunes.

Tour
To support the album, Elisa toured the United States and Canada between 29 October and 24 November 2008.

Track listing
All songs written by Elisa except where noted.

Release dates

Personnel
 Andrea Fontana - Arranger, Drums, Percussion
 Andrew Duckles - Viola
 Benmont Tench - Chamberlin, Organ, Piano
 Christian Rigano - Arranger, Organ (Hammond), Piano
 Corrado Rustici - Arranger, Editing, Guitar, Keyboards, Producer, Programming, Treatments
 David Frazer - Mixing
 Donald Ferrone - Bass
 Emanuele Donnini - Mixing
 Enrique Gonzalez Müller - Assistant, Cuatro
 Glen Ballard - Guitar, Keyboards, Producer
 Guido Andreani - Arranger, Engineer
 Jimmy Johnson - Bass
 John Cuniberti - Mastering
 Josephina Vergara - Violin
 Kevin Mills - Assistant Engineer
 Lance Morrison - Bass
 Mark Valentine - Assistant Engineer
 Matt Chamberlain - Drums, Percussion
 Matt Read - Artwork
 Maurice Grants - Celli
 Max Gelsi - Arranger, Bass (Electric)
 Michael Landau - Guitar
 Michele Richards - Violin
 Pasquale Minieri - Arranger, Mixing, Producer
 Paula Hochhalter - Celli
 Randy Kerber - Keyboards, Piano
 Scott Campbell - Engineer
 Sean Hurley - Bass
 Stephen Marcussen - Mastering
 Stewart Whitmore - Digital Editing
 Suzie Katayama - String Arrangements, String Conductor
 Tim Pierce - Guitar
 Turtle Island String Quartet - Strings
 Veronique Vial - Photography
 William Malina - Engineer, Mixing

References

External links

Elisa (Italian singer) compilation albums
Albums produced by Glen Ballard
2008 compilation albums
Universal Records compilation albums